Druyts is a Flemish surname that may refer to
Natalia Druyts (born 1980), Flemish recording artist and performer
A family of Flemish racing cyclists including:
Demmy Druyts (born 1995)
Gerry Druyts (born 1991)
Jessy Druyts (born 1994)
Kelly Druyts (born 1989)
Lenny Druyts (born 1997)

Dutch-language surnames